Asarone is chemical compound of the phenylpropanoid class found in certain plants such as Acorus and Asarum. There are two isomers, α (or trans) and β (or cis).  As a volatile fragrance oil, it is used in killing pests and bacteria.

Pharmacology 
The main clinical symptom of asarone is prolonged vomiting that sometimes lasted more than 15 hours. Asarone is not metabolized to trimethoxyamphetamine as has been claimed by online vendors.

The Council of Europe Committee of Experts on Flavouring Substances concluded that β-asarone is clearly carcinogenic and has proposed limits for its concentration in flavorings such as bitters made from Acorus calamus (sweet flag).

β-Asarone exhibits anti-fungal activity by inhibiting ergosterol biosynthesis in Aspergillus niger. However, the toxicity and carcinogenicity of asarone means that it may be difficult to develop any practical medication based on it.

See also 
 Elemicin
 2,4,5-Trimethoxypropiophenone

Notes and references 

Phenylpropenes
O-methylated phenylpropanoids
Plant toxins